John David Caute (born 16 December 1936 in Alexandria, Egypt) is a British author, novelist, playwright, historian and journalist.

Background

Caute was educated at Edinburgh Academy, Wellington College, Wadham College, Oxford and St Antony's College, Oxford.

Career

A Henry Fellow at Harvard (1960–61), he was elected a Fellow of All Souls College, Oxford in 1959, but resigned in 1965. From 1966 to 1985 Caute held various academic positions, including Reader at Brunel University, and Visiting Professor at New York University, Columbia University, University of California, Irvine, and Bristol University. He was Literary Editor of the New Statesman 1979–80, and co-chairman of the Writers' Guild of Great Britain, 1982. Caute's historical novel Comrade Jacob (1961), about the 17th-century Digger movement, was adapted as the film Winstanley (1975). Caute's book The Great Fear, a history of the Red Scare in 1940s and 1950s America, was praised by Tribune magazine. He has been a JP and is a Fellow of the Royal Society of Literature.

Works 

Novels

At Fever Pitch, London:  Deutsch, 1959; New York:  Pantheon, 1959. - winner of the Author's Club First Novel Award and the John Llewellyn Rhys Prize.
Comrade Jacob, London:  Deutsch, 1961; New York:  Pantheon, 1962.
The Decline of the West, London:  Deutsch, 1966; New York:  Macmillan, 1966.
The Occupation, London:  Deutsch, 1971; New York:  McGraw-Hill, 1972.
The Baby-Sitters, as John Salisbury.  London:  Secker & Warburg, 1978; New York:  Antheneum, 1978; republished as The Hour Before Midnight, New York:  Dell, 1980.
Moscow Gold, as John Salisbury.  London:  Futura, 1980.
The K-Factor, London:  Joseph, 1983.
News from Nowhere, London:  Hamilton, 1986.
Veronica; or, The Two Nations, London:  Hamilton, 1989; New York:  Viking Penguin, 1989.
The Women's Hour, London:  Paladin, 1991.
Dr. Orwell and Mr. Blair, London:  Weidenfeld & Nicolson, 1994.
Fatima's Scarf, London:  Totterdown Books, 1998.
 Doubles, London, Totterdown Books, 2016

Non-Fiction

Communism and the French Intellectuals 1914-1960, London:  Deutsch, 1964; New York:  Macmillan, 1964.
The Left in Europe Since 1789, London:  Weidenfeld & Nicolson, 1966; New York:  McGraw-Hill, 1966.
Fanon, London: Fontana Modern Masters, 1970; as Frantz Fanon, New York:  Viking, 1970.
The Illusion:  An Essay on Politics, Theatre and the Novel, London:  Deutsch, 1971; New York:  Harper & Row, 1972.
The Fellow-Travellers:  A Postscript to the Enlightenment, London:  Weidenfeld & Nicolson, 1973; New York:  Macmillan, 1973; revised edition, as The Fellow-Travellers:  Intellectual Friends of Communism, New Haven, CT:  Yale University Press, 1988.
Collisions:  Essays and Reviews, London:  Quartet Books, 1974.
Cuba, Yes?, London:  Secker & Warbung, 1974; New York:  McGraw-Hill, 1974.
The Great Fear:  The Anti-Communist Purge Under Truman and Eisenhower, London:  Secker & Warburg, 1978; New York:  Simon & Schuster, 1978.
Under the Skin:  The Death of White Rhodesia, London:  Allen Lane, 1983; Evanston, IL:  Northwestern University Press, 1983.
The Espionage of the Saints:  Two Essays on Silence and the State, London:  Hamilton, 1986.
Sixty-Eight:  The Year of the Barricades, London:  Hamilton, 1988; as The Year of the Barricades:  A Journey through 1968, New York:  Harper & Row, 1988.
Joseph Losey:  A Revenge on Life, London & Boston:  Faber & Faber, 1994; New York:  Oxford University Press, 1994.
The Dancer Defects: The Struggle for Cultural Supremacy During the Cold War, Oxford University Press, 2003.
Marechera and the Colonel: A Zimbabwean Writer and the Claims of the State, London: Totterdown Books, 2009.
Politics and the Novel During the Cold War, New Jersey: Transaction, 2010.
 Isaac and Isaiah: The Covert Punishment of a Cold War Heretic, London: Yale University Press, 2013.
Red List: MI5 and British Intellectuals in the Twentieth Century", London: Verso, 2022

As EditorThe Essential Writings of Karl Marx, London:  MacGibbon & Kee, 1967; New York:  Macmillan, 1968.

DramaThe Demonstration:  A Play, London:  Deutsch, 1970. Performed at the Nottingham Playhouse, 1969, Unity Theatre, 1970, and Junges Theater, Hamburg, 1971The Zimbabwe Tapes, a radio drama, BBC Radio, 1983Henry and the Dogs, a radio drama, BBC Radio, 1986Sanctions, a radio drama, BBC Radio, 1988Animal Fun Park'', a radio drama, BBC Radio, 1995

References

External links 

 
 
 
 

People educated at Edinburgh Academy
British historians
British male journalists
Fellows of the Royal Society of Literature
1936 births
Living people
John Llewellyn Rhys Prize winners
20th-century British novelists
21st-century British novelists
British historical novelists
Writers of historical fiction set in the early modern period